Huañuma (possibly from Aymara waña dry, uma water, "dry water") is a mountain in the Andes of southern Peru, about  high. It is located in the Moquegua Region, Mariscal Nieto Province, Torata District, and in the Tacna Region, Candarave Province, Camilaca District. Huañuma lies south of Limani, Apacheta Limani and Tutupaca, west of the Tutupaca volcano, north of Chuquiananta and northeast of Pomani.

Huañuma is also the name of an intermittent stream which originates near the mountain. Its waters flow to Asana River.

References

Mountains of Moquegua Region
Mountains of Tacna Region
Mountains of Peru